Fiumefreddo di Sicilia is a comune in the Metropolitan City of Catania on the coast of the Ionian Sea on the island of Sicily, southern Italy. It shares its borders with the municipalities of Calatabiano to the north, Mascali to the south and Piedimonte Etneo to the west.

The commune gets its name from the Fiumefreddo River which runs alongside the territory of the comune.  The word "fiumefreddo" means literally "cold river", a reference to the fact that the river is fed by snow melts from Mount Etna.  Fiumefreddo di Sicilia is near the major Etna tourist centres. The SS120 to Mount Etna and Randazzo start from there.

Fiumefreddo di Sicilia  was so named to distinguish it from Fiumefreddo Bruzio, in the Province of Cosenza. Currently the town has almost 10,000 inhabitants.

Geography 
 
Fiumefreddo stands along the SS 114 and A18, both roads running from Catania to Messina. Fiumefreddo di Sicilia is in the heart of a road and railway network, near Taormina and Acireale, not far from Catania and Messina.   

Fiumefreddo is bounded by the Ionian Sea to the East, by Calatabiano to the North, by Piedimonte Etneo to the West and by Mascali to the South. Its municipal territory is mainly flat, especially along the coast, where there is the Marina di Cottone beach, which is subject to very intense summer tourism.

Fiumefreddo is so named after the river that runs through it, whose natural habitat, with its  cold water, has allowed the development of typical river flora and fauna. In order to protect this particular natural environment, the Sicilian regional government, through a law D.A. n. 205185, has instituted a protected area, The Nature Reserve of The River Fiumefreddo.

Free mandarines, oranges and cactus fruits close to the station from the trees to take.

History
Fiumefreddo originated in the 18th century around a 16th-century watchtower. It became an independent commune in 1801.

Main sights

Church of Santissima Maria Immacolata
Church of Maria Santissima del Rosario (18th century)
Castello degli Schiavi ("Slaves' Castle"), an example of rural Sicilian Baroque architecture.  The building was used for several shots in the American movie The Godfather (parts I and II).
Red Tower, a funerary building of Roman origins

Twin towns
 Oelsnitz, Germany, since 2002
  Aš, Czech Republic, since 2002

Sources

References